The Vanadium Corporation of America was a commercial producer of vanadium, a transition metal and a strengthening additive for steel. The company was founded in 1906 by Joseph M. Flannery and was headquartered in Pittsburgh, Pennsylvania. The company operated several vanadium mines in multiple countries, including Peru. The raw material was converted into a ferroalloy at its plant in Bridgeville, Pennsylvania.

By 1914, it was estimated that 75 percent of the world's vanadium ore production came from the American vanadium mine in Minas Ragra, Peru, making it one of the largest producers of the element in the world.

In August 1916, James J. Flannery sold the company but remained chairman of the board. J. Leonard Replogle headed the syndicate that took over the company and became president of the new firm, which retained its original name.

In 1919, the company acquired the Primos Chemical Company.

References

External links

 Science History Institute Digital Collections (Photographs and ephemera documenting the facilities and activities of the Vanadium Corporation of America from 1911 to 1976 freely available for download in a variety of formats).

 Chemical companies of the United States
 Chemical companies established in 1906
 Defunct companies based in Pennsylvania
1906 establishments in Pennsylvania